The 2023 Ball State Cardinals men's volleyball team represents Ball State University in the 2023 NCAA Division I & II men's volleyball season. The Cardinals, led by 2nd year head coach Donan Cruz, play their home games at Worthen Arena. The Cardinals are members of the Midwestern Intercollegiate Volleyball Association and were picked to finish first in the MIVA preseason poll.

Roster

Schedule
{| class="wikitable sortable" style="width:90%"
|-
! style="" scope="col"|DateTime
! style="" scope="col"|Opponent
! style="" scope="col"| Rank
! style="" scope="col"|ArenaCity(Tournament)
! style="" scope="col"|Television
! style="" scope="col"|Score
! style="" scope="col"|Attendance
! style="" scope="col"|Record(MIVA Record)
|- align="center" bgcolor="#ffbbb"
|1/127 p.m.
|@ #1 Hawai'i 
|#6
|Stan Sheriff Center Honolulu, HI
|ESPN+
|L 1–3  (16–25, 23–25, 25–22, 17–25)
|5,581
|0–1
|- align="center" bgcolor="#ffbbb"
|1/1312 a.m.
|@ #1 Hawai'i 
|#6
|Stan Sheriff CenterHonolulu, HI
|ESPN+
|L 1–3  (25–23, 23–25, 18–25, 18–25)
|6,646
|0-2
|- align="center" bgcolor="#ccffcc"
|1/207 p.m.
|Harvard
|#6
|Worthen ArenaMuncie, IN
|ESPN+
|W 3-0  (25–16, 25–18, 25–14)
|2,151
|1-2
|- align="center" bgcolor="#ccffcc"
|1/217 p.m.
|Tusculum
|#6
|Worthen ArenaMuncie, IN
|Ball State All-Access 
|W 3-2  (25–21, 25–22, 22–25, 24-26, 15-7)
|1,237
|2-2
|- align="center" bgcolor="#ccffcc"
|1/277 p.m.
|Queens
|#8
|Worthen ArenaMuncie, IN
|ESPN+
|W 3-0  (25–15, 25–15, 25-15)
|1,562
|3-2
|- align="center" bgcolor="#ccffcc"
|1/285 p.m.
|Sacred Heart
|#8
|Worthen ArenaMuncie, IN
|Ball State All-Access
|W 3-0  (25–11, 25–16, 25-21)
|1,371
|4-2
|- align="center" bgcolor="#ffbbb"
|2/027 p.m.
|#11 BYU
|#8
|Worthen ArenaMuncie, IN
|ESPN3
|L 1-3  (26-24, 23–25, 21-25, 25-27)
|1,567
|4-3
|- align="center" bgcolor="#ccffcc"
|2/043 p.m.
|#11 BYU
|#8
|Worthen ArenaMuncie, IN
|ESPN3
|W 3-1  (24-26, 25–23, 25-19, 25-23)
|1,711
|5-3
|- align="center" bgcolor="#ffbbb"
|2/097 p.m.
|Lewis*
|#9
|Worthen ArenaMuncie, IN
|ESPN+
|L 2-3(22-25, 25–19, 23–25, 25-20, 16-18)
|1,100
|5-4(0-1)
|- align="center" bgcolor="#ccffcc"
|2/115 p.m.
|McKendree*
|#9
|Worthen ArenaMuncie, IN
|ESPN+
|W 3-1(25-21, 25-23, 23-25, 25-20)
|1,242
|6-4(1-1)
|- align="center" bgcolor="#ffbbb"
|2/168 p.m.
|@ #13 Loyola Chicago*
|#11
|Joseph J. Gentile ArenaChicago, IL
|ESPN+
|L 1-3(25-23, 21-25, 21-25, 22-25)
|667
|6-5(1-2)
|- align="center" bgcolor="#ccffcc"
|2/187 p.m.
|@ Purdue Fort Wayne*
|#11
|Hilliard Gates Sports CenterFt. Wayne, IN
|ESPN+
|W 3-2(25-20, 24-26, 25-22, 19-25, 15-8)
|918
|7-5(2-2)
|- align="center" bgcolor="#ccffcc"
|2/248 p.m.
|@ Lindenwood*
|#12
|Robert F. Hyland ArenaSt. Charles, MO
|ESPN+
|W 3-2(14-25, 18-25, 25-17, 25-22, 15-8)
|312
|8-5(3-2)
|- align="center" bgcolor="#ccffcc"
|2/256 p.m.
|@ Quincy*
|#12
|Pepsi ArenaQuincy, IL
|GLVC SN
|W 3-0(25-23, 25-22, 25-22)
|563
|9-5(4-2)
|- align="center" bgcolor="#ccffcc"
|3/016 p.m.
|Central State
|#12
|Worthen ArenaMuncie, IN
|ESPN+
|W 3-0(25-16, 25-9, 25-19)
|423
|10-5
|- align="center" bgcolor="#ffbbb"
|3/0310 p.m.
|@ #4 Long Beach State
|#12
|Walter PyramidLong Beach, CA
|ESPN+
|L 1-3(19-25, 17-25, 25-21, 15-25)
|1,318
|10-6
|- align="center" bgcolor="#ccffcc"
|3/058 p.m.
|@ UC San Diego
|#12
|LionTree ArenaLa Jolla, CA
|ESPN+ 
|W 3-2(23-25, 25-19, 25-15, 23-25, 15-12)
|301
|11-6
|- align="center" bgcolor="#ffbbb"
|3/0810 p.m.
|@ #5 Grand Canyon
|#11
|GCU ArenaPhoenix, AZ
|ESPN+
|L 0-3(24-26, 23-25, 19-25)
|545
|11-7
|- align="center" bgcolor="#ccffcc"
|3/157 p.m.
|#15 Ohio State*
|#12
|Worthen ArenaMuncie, IN
|ESPN+
|W 3-0(26-24, 25-15, 25-20)
|1,350
|12-7(5-2)
|- align="center" bgcolor="#ffbbb"
|3/187 p.m.
|@ #15 Ohio State*
|#12
|Covelli CenterColumbus, OH
|B1G+
|L 2-3'''(25-23, 26-24, 18-25, 24-26, 12-15)
|965
|12-8(5-3)
|- align="center" 
|3/247 p.m.
|Quincy*
|#12
|Worthen ArenaMuncie, IN
|ESPN+ 
|
|
|
|- align="center" 
|3/256 p.m.
|Lindenwood*
|#12
|Worthen ArenaMuncie, IN
|ESPN+
|
|
|
|- align="center" 
|3/308 p.m.
|@ McKendree*
|
|Melvin Price Convocation CenterLebanon, IL
|GLVC SN
|
|
|
|- align="center" 
|4/016 p.m.
|@ Lewis*
|
|Neil Carey Arena Romeoville, IL
|GLVC SN
|
|
|
|- align="center" 
|4/067 p.m.
|Loyola Chicago 
|
|Worthen ArenaMuncie, IN
|ESPN+
|
|
|
|- align="center" 
|4/087 p.m.
|Purdue Fort Wayne 
|
|Worthen ArenaMuncie, IN
|ESPN+
|
|
|
|}
 *-Indicates conference match.
 Times listed are Eastern Time Zone.

Broadcasters
Hawai'i: Kanoa Leahey, Chris McLachlin, & Ryan TsujiHawai'i: Kanoa Leahey, Chris McLachlin, & Ryan TsujiHarvard: Joey Lindstrom, Amber Seaman, & Madison Surface
Tusculum: No commentaryQueens: 
Sacred Heart: No commentaryBYU: Lexi Eblen & Hudson French 
BYU: Mick Tidrow, Amber Seaman, & Madison Surface 
Lewis: 
McKendree: 
Loyola Chicago: 
Purdue Fort Wayne: 
Lindenwood: 
Quincy: 
Central State: 
Long Beach State: 
UC San Diego: 
Grand Canyon: 
Ohio State: 
Ohio State: 
Quincy: 
Lindenwood:
McKendree: 
Lewis: 
Loyola Chicago:
Purdue Fort Wayne:

Rankings 

^The Media did not release a pre-season poll.

Honors
To be filled in upon competition of the season.

References

2023 in sports in Indiana
2023 NCAA Division I & II men's volleyball season
2023 team
Ball State